John Paul II High School is a private Roman Catholic college preparatory high school in Plano, Texas. The school is within the Roman Catholic Diocese of Dallas.  The school's Vision is "We will make a difference in the world by walking in the footsteps of Pope John Paul II" and the school's Mission is "To develop leaders who are critical thinkers and effective communicators, committed to service and rooted in faith".

Extracurricular activities 
Below is an incomplete list of extracurricular activities available to John Paul II students:

Academics & science

Communications

Fine arts

Faith-based
 Honduran Missionaries
 Pro-life Club

Language
 Junior Classical League (Latin language club)
 National French Honor Society
 Sociedad Honoraria Hispanica (Spanish Honor Society)

Cheer
 Cheerleading
 Drill team (Cardinal Belles)

Student leadership & support

Athletics 
John Paul II High School has a strong history in athletics and athletic programs continue to show steady growth.  The Cardinals compete in the largest division of TAPPS, or Texas Association of Private and Parochial Schools.  JPII offers 18 Varsity sports teams with more than 70% of the student body participating in athletics.

The Girls Varsity Basketball Team won the school's first TAPPS 6A State Championship in 2013 under the late head coach Mike Martin, and its second under head coach John Griffin in 2022.  The squad has been state finalists six times, including 2008, a four-year stretch from 2011-2014, and 2020.  The Boys Basketball Team has been to the State Tournament seven times, (2011-2014, 2019-2021) and won the TAPPS 6A State Championship in 2020 and 2022 under head coach Dan Lee.  The Varsity Girls earned District Champion titles in 2013, 2020, and 2022, while the Varsity Boys have been District Champions four times, in 2013 and 2020-2022.

The Boy's Varsity Soccer Team also has won a number of district championships, including three consecutive years from 2014–2016, and again in 2021.  The team placed second in the TAPPS Division 1 State Championship tournament in 2015-16 and in 2020-21, and were state finalists in 2009, 2012, 2015-2016, and 2022.  The Girls Varsity Soccer Team also placed second in the state behind Ursuline Academy in 2017-2018, and have been state finalists in 2008, 2011, 2014, and 2018.  The Lady Cards won their first TAPPSS division 1 State Championship in 2022 following a 2-0 win over Houston St. Pius X.  

Cardinal Tennis has always been competitive, with the Varsity Boys winning the TAPPS State Championship in 2016 and were runners-up in 2022.  The Varsity Girls earned state finalist honors in 2007, 2010, 2013, and 2018–2019, while the Varsity Boys earned state finalist honors in 2014, 2016, 2018, 2019 and 2022.  The Varsity Boys have been crowned District Champions five times (2008, 2014, 2016, 2019, and 2022) and the Varsity Girls have earned District Champion status twice (2018-2019).

Cardinal Golf is also among the best in TAPPS, with the Varsity Girls earning state finalist honors in 2007, 2008, and 2019, along with district championships for the girls in 2007, and three times for the boys, in 2014, 2018, and 2019.  Additionally, the Varsity Hockey team won a TAHA State Championship in 2016.  Cardinal Swimming has had recent success, with the Varsity Boys placing second at the TAPPS State Championships in 2016 and third in 2021.  Michael Belair, class of 2021, currently holds state records in the 50 Free, 100 Free, and 200 Free and is a six-time state champion.  JPII Cross Country has won district titles three times, in 2015, 2018, and 2019, while Cardinal Baseball won back-to-back district championships in 2014-2015.  The Cardinal Football team has also found recent success, earning State Finalist honors in 2019 after falling to Parish Episcopal in the TAPPS 6A State Championship.  JPII alumni Donavyn Lester is the state record holder in the 110M Hurdles (14.77s) and 300M Hurdles (37.83), marks he set at the 2019 State Championships.

The Cardinal Belles, John Paul II's drill team, have been historically excellent, winning TAPPS State Championships in 2015, 2019, 2020, 2021, and 2022.  The Belles have been state finalists two additional times, in 2016 and 2017.  The Varsity Cheerleading squad took home silver at the 2019 TAPPS State Championships and won the 2022 Division 1 State Title.

References

External links 
 

Catholic secondary schools in Texas
High schools in Plano, Texas
Educational institutions established in 2005
2005 establishments in Texas